The Immanuel Church  in La Grange, Tennessee is a historic Episcopal church at 2nd and Chestnut Street.

The church was established as a mission in 1832. The church building was built in 1842 and consecrated in 1843. It was added to the National Register of Historic Places in 1972.

During the Civil War, the Union army used it as an armory and hospital.  The pews were torn out and used as coffins for Union dead.

It is also a contributing building in the La Grange Historic District, listed on the National Register in 1975.

References

Episcopal churches in Tennessee
Churches on the National Register of Historic Places in Tennessee
Churches completed in 1843
19th-century Episcopal church buildings
Buildings and structures in Fayette County, Tennessee
1832 establishments in Tennessee
National Register of Historic Places in Fayette County, Tennessee